The Roman Catholic Archdiocese of Villavicencio is an archdiocese located in the city of Villavicencio in Colombia.

History

Bishops

Ordinaries, in reverse chronological order
 Archbishops of Villavicencio (Roman rite), below
 Archbishop Oscar Urbina Ortega (2007.11.30 – 2022.04.23)
 Archbishop José Octavio Ruiz Arenas (2004.07.03 – 2007.05.31), appointed Vice President of the Pontifical Commission for Latin America
 Bishops of Villavicencio (Roman rite), below
 Archbishop José Octavio Ruiz Arenas (2002.07.16 – 2004.07.03)
 Bishop Alfonso Cabezas Aristizábal, C.M. (1994.05.03 – 2001.06.16)
 Bishop Gregorio Garavito Jiménez, S.M.M. (1969.04.26 – 1994.05.03)
 Bishop Frans Joseph Bruls Canisius, S.M.M. (1964.02.11 – 1969.04.26)
 Vicar Apostolic of Villavicencio (Roman rite), below
 Bishop Frans Joseph Bruls Canisius, S.M.M. (1949.06.09 – 1964.02.11)
 Vicars Apostolic of Los Llanos de San Martín (Roman rite), below 
 Bishop Frans Joseph Bruls Canisius, S.M.M. (1939.06.27 – 1949.06.09)
 Bishop Joseph-Marie-Désiré Guiot, S.M.M. (1908.04.04 – 1939.06.24)

Coadjutor bishops
Francisco José Bruls Canisius, S.M.M. (1939), as Coadjutor Vicar Apostolic
Alfonso Cabezas Aristizábal, C.M. (1992-1994)

Auxiliary bishop
Gregorio Garavito Jiménez, S.M.M. (1961-1969), appointed Bishop here

Suffragan dioceses
 Granada 
 San José del Guaviare

See also
Roman Catholicism in Colombia

Sources

External links
 GCatholic.org
 Diocese website
 

Roman Catholic dioceses in Colombia
Roman Catholic Ecclesiastical Province of Villavicencio
Christian organizations established in 1903
Roman Catholic dioceses and prelatures established in the 20th century